Titanic Waltz (Romanian: Titanic vals) is a 1964 Romanian comedy film directed by Paul Călinescu and starring Grigore Vasiliu-Birlic, and . It was based on a play of the same name by Tudor Mușatescu.

The film's sets were designed by Stefan Norris.

Partial cast
 Grigore Vasiliu-Birlic as Spirache Necșulescu 
  as Chiriachița  
  as Dacia 
 Mitzura Arghezi as Gena  
 Lucian Dinu as Traian  
 Coca Andronescu as Sarmisegetuza  
 Liviu Bădescu as Decebal  
 Ion Finteșteanu as the Mayor  
 Mihai Fotino as Dinu  
  as Rădulescu Nercea
 Ion Dichiseanu as Gigi Stamatescu  
 Florin Scărlătescu
 Constantin Rauțchi as a town hall clerk  
  as the organ-grinder  
 Mircea Balaban 
 Ion Pacea 
 Ștefan Mihăilescu-Brăila as an electoral bully
 Atena Seciu 
 Tamara Buciuceanu-Botez as Doica

References

Bibliography 
 Dina Iordanova. The Cinema of the Balkans. Wallflower, 2006.

External links 
 

1964 films
1964 comedy films
Romanian comedy films
1960s Romanian-language films
Films directed by Paul Călinescu